CHKF-FM is a radio station that broadcasts multicultural content, including a major Chinese programming block entitled Fairchild Radio at 94.7 FM in Calgary, Alberta, Canada. It is owned by Fairchild Group.
CHKF's studios are located on 37th Avenue Northeast in Calgary, while its transmitter is located near the Arbour Lake neighbourhood in northwest Calgary near Stoney Trail.

CHKF's programming is primarily Cantonese with some Cambodian, Croatian, Filipino, German, Hindi, Hungarian, Irish, Italian, Japanese, Lao, Macedonian, Mandarin, Polish, Punjabi, Russian, Spanish, Thai, Urdu and Vietnamese programming during the evenings and on weekends.

References

External links
 Fairchild Radio
 CHKF-FM history - Canadian Communications Foundation
 

HKF
HKF
Radio stations established in 1998
1998 establishments in Alberta